Garwood can refer to:

People
 Doug Garwood, American golfer
 Edmund Johnston Garwood, British geologist
 Julie Garwood, author
 Kelton Garwood, American actor
 Richard Garwood, Air Marshall in the Royal Air Force
 Robert R. Garwood, prisoner-of-war
 Tirzah Garwood (1908–1951) British artist and engraver
 William Garwood, American silent-film actor and director

Geography

Places in the United States
 Garwood, Idaho
 Garwood, Missouri
 Garwood, New Jersey
 Garwood (NJT station), a New Jersey Transit railroad station on the Raritan Valley Line
 Garwood, Texas
 Garwood, West Virginia

Places in Antarctica
 Garwood Point
 Garwood Valley